Havenga is a surname. Notable people with the surname include:

Arno Havenga (born 1974), Dutch water polo player and coach
Nicolaas Havenga (1882-1957), South African politician
Willie Havenga (1924–2008), South African footballer
Wynand Havenga (born 1965), South African darts player